Faurot may refer to:
Faurot Field, home field of the University of Missouri Tigers in Columbia, Missouri
Don Faurot (1902–1995), head football coach at the University of Missouri
Ron Faurot (born January 27, 1962), former professional American football defensive lineman
Inspector Faurot, of the New York City Hans B. Schmidt case